Murid betaherpesvirus 3 (MuHV-3) is a species of virus in the genus Roseolovirus, subfamily Betaherpesvirinae, family Herpesviridae, and order Herpesvirales.

References 

Betaherpesvirinae